Joyce Eileen Tanac (born September 27, 1950) is an American gymnast. She competed in six events at the 1968 Summer Olympics with the best individual result of 27th place on uneven bars and balance beam.

Tanac won the all-around, floor, beam, vault, and uneven bars events at the 1966 YMCA Championships and 1969 AAU Championships. Besides the Olympics she was part of the U.S. teams at the 1966 World Championships and 1967 Pan American Games. In 1969 she won a bronze medal all-around at the first Gymnastics World Cup. In 1972 she graduated from the University of Washington and later worked as a pharmacist. In 1990 she was inducted into the US Gymnastics Hall of Fame, and in 1998 into the University of Washington Athletic Hall of Fame. A gymnastics element, a dismount on even bars, is named after her.

References

External links
 

1950 births
Living people
American female artistic gymnasts
Olympic gymnasts of the United States
Gymnasts at the 1968 Summer Olympics
Sportspeople from Seattle
Pan American Games medalists in gymnastics
Pan American Games gold medalists for the United States
Pan American Games silver medalists for the United States
Gymnasts at the 1967 Pan American Games
Medalists at the 1967 Pan American Games
21st-century American women